Jack Swigert, or John L. "Jack" Swigert, Jr., is a bronze sculpture depicting the astronaut of the same name by George and Mark Lundeen, installed in the United States Capitol Visitor Center's Emancipation Hall, in Washington, D.C., as part of the National Statuary Hall Collection. The statue was donated by the U.S. state of Colorado in 1997. A duplicate of the statue is present in Concourse B of Denver International Airport.

See also
 1997 in art

References

External links
 

1997 establishments in Washington, D.C.
1997 sculptures
Bronze sculptures in Washington, D.C.
Denver International Airport
Monuments and memorials in Washington, D.C.
Swigert
Sculptures of men in Colorado
Sculptures of men in Washington, D.C.
Statues in Colorado
Jack Swigert